Deh-e Molla Kuchek (also Romanized as Deh-e Mollā Kūchek and Deh Mollā Kūchek) is a village in Soviren Rural District, Cham Khalaf-e Isa District, Hendijan County, Khuzestan Province, Iran. At the 2006 census, its population was 56, in 13 families.

References 

Populated places in Hendijan County